Old Stone House, also known as the Webster-Martin-Ireland House, is a historic inn and boarding house, located at Pennsboro, Ritchie County, West Virginia. The main section was built about 1810, and is a -story stone structure, five bays wide and two bays deep, with a gable roof.  Attached to it is a two-story frame addition with a hipped roof.  It features a one-story porch across the front facade.  It is open by the Ritchie County Historical Society as a historic house and local history museum.

It was listed on the National Register of Historic Places in 1978.

References

External links
Ritchie County Chamber of Commerce

Historic house museums in West Virginia
Houses on the National Register of Historic Places in West Virginia
Museums in Ritchie County, West Virginia
Stone houses in West Virginia
National Register of Historic Places in Ritchie County, West Virginia
Houses completed in 1810
Houses in Ritchie County, West Virginia